Anderson Gils de Sampaio (born February 15, 1977) is a former Brazilian football player.

Playing career
Anderson Gils joined Japanese J1 League club Yokohama Flügels in September 1997. However he could not play at all in the match in 1997 season. He debuted in J1 against Yokohama Marinos in opening match in 1998 season. He played many matches as forward in 1998 and the club won the champions Emperor's Cup. However the club was disbanded end of 1998 season due to financial strain.

Club statistics

References

External links

1977 births
Living people
Brazilian footballers
J1 League players
Yokohama Flügels players
Brazilian expatriate footballers
Expatriate footballers in Japan
Association football forwards